Mian Shahul Mouhammed Kalhoro: (Urdu) ميان شاهال محمد خان کلھوڑو : was the famous Ruler of the Kalhora Dynasty that ruled Sindh from 1620 to 1657. He was not only ruler but saint also after his elder brother death Main Elyas Muhammad Kalhoro he became the ruler of Sindh. He dug Ghar canel and irritated local lands when his influence increased he forcefully occupied lands as well, those lands belonged to Jalal Khan Abro, and Halar Khan Abro, on which they fought and he was killed in battle and later he buried on the upper bank of Ghar canel in village Dittal Abro, Qambar Shahdadkot District.

References

This article includes content derived from "History of Sind - translated from Persian books" by Mirza Kalichbeg Fredunbeg (1853-1929), published in Karachi in 1902 and now in the public domain.

Sindhi people
History of Sindh
1600 births
1657 deaths